Lover's Rhapsody, also known as Songs from Lover's Rhapsody, is a studio album by television personality, Jackie Gleason. It was released in 1953 on Capitol Records (catalog no. H-366). The musicians included Bobby Hackett on trumpet.

Lover's Rhapsody reached No. 2 on Billboard magazine's pop album chart in August and September 1953.

AllMusic gave the album a rating of three stars.

Track listing 
Side A
 "Desire"
 "Flirtation"
 "Temptation"
 "Enchantment"

Side B
 "When Your Lover Has Gone"
 "Tenderly"
 "I'm Thru with Love"
 "Dark Is the Night"

References

Jackie Gleason albums
1953 albums
Capitol Records albums